The England cricket team toured South Africa in 2004–05. England won the five-Test series 2–1, achieving their first series win in South Africa for 40 years, when MJK Smith's side were victorious in 1964–65; however, South Africa won the seven-match ODI series 4–1, one match finishing as a tie and the other as "no result".

The Test series saw the awarding of the inaugural Basil D'Oliveira Trophy, named for the South Africa-born England cricketer Basil D'Oliveira.

Background
England went into the series having won all seven Test matches they played during the English summer, demolishing the West Indies and New Zealand.

Squads

Tour matches

45-over: Nicky Oppenheimer XI vs England XI

First-class: South Africa A vs England XI

50-over: South Africa A vs England XI

Test series

1st Test

2nd Test

3rd Test

4th Test

5th Test

ODI series

1st ODI

2nd ODI

3rd ODI

4th ODI

5th ODI

6th ODI

7th ODI

References

External links
England tour of South Africa, 2004/05 at ESPNcricinfo.com

2004 in English cricket
2005 in English cricket
2004 in South African cricket
2005 in South African cricket
2004-05
England 2004-05
International cricket competitions in 2004–05